Achlya flavicornis, the yellow horned, is a moth of the family Drepanidae. The species was first described by Carl Linnaeus in his 1758 10th edition of Systema Naturae. It is found from Europe to the eastern Palearctic ecozone.

The wingspan is 35–40 mm. The length of the forewings is 17–20 mm. The ground colour is greenish grey, sometimes speckled or dusted with darker grey. The reniform and orbicular marks are generally clear and distinct, but in some examples they are united and form a whitish blotch outlined in blackish; the cross lines are usually well defined, but in the dark grey dusted form are very obscure. The moth flies from February to April depending on the location.

The final instar larva is either off white all over or off white below the spiracles and darker greyish or olive green dorsally. There is a row of black spots and finely black-edged white dots. The insect overwinters as a pupa in a cocoon, amongst leaf litter.

The larvae feed on birch.

Subspecies
Achlya flavicornis flavicornis
Achlya flavicornis jesoensis (Matsumura, 1927) (Russian Far East, north-eastern China, Korea, Japan: Hokkaido)
Achlya flavicornis sikhotensis Tshistjakov, 2008 (Russian Far East)

References

External links

Description in South. R. Moths of the British Isles
Lepidoptera of Belgium
Lepiforum.de
Vlindernet.nl 

Thyatirinae
Moths described in 1758
Drepanid moths of Great Britain
Moths of Asia
Moths of Europe
Taxa named by Carl Linnaeus